L'Acéphale is an American avant-garde black metal band fronted by Portland, Oregon musician Set Sothis Nox La.

Discography
 Mord Und Totschlag (self-released, 2005; re-issue: Aurora Borealis, 2007)
 Stahlhartes Gehäuse (Parasitic Records, 2009)
 Malefeasance (Aurora Borealis, 2009)
 L' Acéphale (Eisenwald, 2019)

References

External links
 L'Acéphale (official site)

Musical groups established in 2003
American black metal musical groups
Heavy metal musical groups from Oregon
2003 establishments in Oregon